Beauvallon is a commune in the department of Rhône, eastern France. The municipality was established on 1 January 2018 by merger of the former communes of Saint-Andéol-le-Château (the seat), Chassagny and Saint-Jean-de-Touslas.

See also 
Communes of the Rhône department

References 

Communes of Rhône (department)
Populated places established in 2018
2018 establishments in France